Margit Felligi or Margit Felligi Laszlo (1903 – 1975) was an American clothing designer, notable for her work with Cole of California in swimwear.

Early life
Margit Felligi was born in 1903 in Saint Louis, Missouri, the daughter of Hungarian immigrants Emil Felligi and Elizabeth Jilly. She was educated at the Chicago Academy of Fine Arts, where she studied art, as well as dance. She moved to Beverly Hills, California to design and create costumes for movies.

Cole of California
In 1936 Felligi joined the design staff of Cole Knitting Mills, later known as Cole of California, as head designer. In addition to swimsuit design for Fred Cole, Felligi created new fabrics that incorporated elastic, giving suits stretchy and clingy properties.Several of these products were patented by Felligi. Other of Felligi's designs were worn by Esther Williams in promotions done for Cole. Felligi's designs propelled Cole to the forefront of casual fashion  design. 

In 1943 Felligi introduced the "Swoon Suit," a two-piece swimsuit that avoided wartime restrictions on rubber use by using side laces. Felligi worked with structure as well, incorporating foam rubber bras. Later designs worked with drapes and asymmetry. Felligi's 1964 "Scandal Suit" featured a deeply plunging neckline filled with mesh fabric, and an even deeper back line.

Felligi worked with Cole until 1972. She was married to Aladar Laszlo, a Hungarian immigrant who found work as a writer and actor in Hollywood. They had four children. Margit Felligi Laszlo died in 1975.

Museum holdings
Several of Felli's designs are included in the permanent collections of major museums, including the Metropolitan Museum of Art, the Los Angeles County Museum of Art, and the Fine Arts Museums of San Francisco.

References

1903 births
1975 deaths
California people in fashion